The Ministry of Defence is one of the 12 ministries which comprise the Finnish Government. The ministry is in charge of Finland's national defence policy, national security, and international cooperation in defence policy matters. It is Finland's ministry of defence. The ministry is headed by the Minister of Defence.

The Ministry of Defence's budget for 2018 is €2,871,971,000. As of 2016, roughly 25% of the defence budget was spent in payroll of the defence forces, 20% in procurement of material and 25% in other operational expenses.

References

External links

 
Government of Finland
Defence